Paul Lee (born 21 March 1981, in Nottingham, England) is a motorcycle speedway rider. He rode for the Mildenhall Fen Tigers after spending 2007  with the King's Lynn Stars.

Career Honours 
Premier League Championship medal winner 1999
Premier League Four Team Tournament medal winner 1999 & 2000
Premier League Premiership medal winner 1999
Premier League winner 2007
Conference League Championship medal winner 2003
England Under 21 Captain during tour of Australia 2001.

References

1981 births
Living people
British speedway riders
English motorcycle racers
Coventry Bees riders
King's Lynn Stars riders
Mildenhall Fen Tigers riders
Sheffield Tigers riders